Pogaru is a 2021 Indian Kannada-language masala film directed by Nanda Kishore and produced by B. K. Gangadhar. The film stars Dhruva Sarja and Rashmika Mandanna with Chikkanna, P. Ravi Shankar, Pavitra Lokesh, and Raghavendra Rajkumar in supporting roles, and Sampath Raj, Dhananjay, Kai Greene, Morgan Aste and Dharma as antagonists. 

Chandan Shetty and Gummineni Vijay composed the soundtrack, while V. Harikrishna composed the background score. Cinematography and editing are performed by Vijay Milton and Mahesh S respectively. The film was planned as a Kannada and Telugu bilingual film, but the Telugu version was later dropped and a dubbed version was released in both Telugu and Tamil. The film’s Tamil dubbed version is titled as Semma Thimiru. It was later dubbed into Hindi under the same title  Pogaru  by RKD Studio.

Plot
A young Shiva loses his father, who was actually killed by JB as his father became a witness to JB's crimes. Shiva is unknown of his father's death and learns that his mother Lakshmi's second marriage with Executive officer Ramakrishna from his dying grandmother, who makes Shiva promise that he will take care of Lakshmi. Shiva agrees and ask Lakshmi to come with him without Ramakrishna and his daughter (Shiva's sister), but disagrees which leads Shiva to become a rogue. Years later, Shiva becomes a notorious rogue, who hates Ramakrishna and his daughter for snatching Lakshmi away from him. Shiva meets a teacher named Geetha, who soon falls for her good nature. 

JB decide to grab the colony, but is opposed by Ramakrishna. JB's son Daali takes Shiva's help. Shiva agrees and gets Ramakrishna arrested and also takes his sister to Daali's hideout, but thrashes Daali and his henchmen as he realized his sister's affection, but Shiva's sister is injured in the battle and is taken to the hospital. Lakshmi berates Shiva and tells him to never show her face again. Shiva talks about his difficulties to Lord Hanuman where Geetha also realizes her mistake and reconciles with Shiva. Daali goes into coma which makes JB enraged and kidnaps the colony's kids to burn them alive. Shiva saves them and defeats JB's bodyguards and burns JB alive, Thus Shiva reunites with his family and changes his ways.

Cast

Music 

Chandan Shetty compose the songs. Movie audio released on 14 February 2021 in Davangere with ex-CM Siddaramaiah as Chief guest.

Kannada (Pogaru)

Tamil (Sema Thimiru)

Telugu (Pogaru)

Release 
The film was scheduled to be released on 24 March 2020, but was postponed amid the COVID-19 lockdown in India. It was released on 19 February 2021,in Kannada, along with dubbed versions in Telugu and Tamil(titled Semma Thimiru). The film was also dubbed in Hindi by RKD Studios on YouTube on 25 April 2021.

Box office
The film opened with 100% occupancy and collect  from 2 days. On success meet producer announced movie collected  in 6 days. The film was a failure in Tamil and Telugu versions but a commercial success in Kannada version.

Controversies 
The video of the song titled Karabuu, in which the protagonist and scores of his other side kick goons appear to be harassing the leading lady (Rashmika Mandanna), came under controversy. The character played by Dhruva Sarja was touching her inappropriately, visibly unconsented, throughout the video. There were violent scenes like setting bikes ablaze to get her attention, and threatening her with a knife on streets while his sidekicks keep cheering him to do more of this to the terrified woman, who ironically is his love interest. The video appears to be glorifying the harassment and eve-teasing, and was panned for the same by women right activists in media. The actress, who has earlier done a Telugu film Dear Comrade with 'women harassment' as a major plot point, was also called out for signing such a movie, was alleged that she did so just for the money. A police complaint was registered against the director about the brutal eve teasing. "In the song, hero Dhruva Sarja is trying to win Rashmika Mandanna’s heart by showing her knives, getting his henchmen to destroy vehicles as she walks, doing pull-ups with her holding onto him" stated the article.

An additional controversy arose shortly after the film's release, where the film was accused of demeaning Brahmin priests. After the controversy arose, director Kishore stated that these scenes would be removed and the film would be edited accordingly for re-release. 14 scenes were removed which leads to controversy and add 8 minutes new footage to movie for re-releasing on 26 February 2021.

References

External links
 
Films shot in Karnataka
Indian action drama films
2020s masala films
2021 films
2020s Kannada-language films
2021 action drama films
Films directed by Nanda Kishore
Films scored by Chandan Shetty